Essam Ali is an Egyptian footballer who plays as a centre forward for Ismaily SC.

References

External links
 

1989 births
Living people
Egyptian footballers
Association football forwards
Ismaily SC players